Warmer Corners is the ninth album by The Lucksmiths released in 2005 on Candle Records (catalogue number LUCKY19.)

Track listing
 "A Hiccup in Your Happiness" (Donald) – 2:48
 "The Music Next Door" (Donald) – 4:33
 "Great Lengths" (Donald) – 3:28
 "Now I'm Even Further Away" (Monnone) – 1:52
 "The Chapter in Your Life Entitled San Francisco" (Donald) – 4:29
 "Sunlight in a Jar" (White) – 3:22
 "If You Lived Here, You'd Be Home Now" (Donald) – 4:48
 "Young and Dumb" (Monnone) – 3:27
 "Putting It off and Putting It off" (Donald) – 2:46
 "I Don't Want to Walk Around Alone No More" (Monnone) – 3:09
 "The Fog of Trujillo" (Monnone) – 4:15
 "Fiction" (Donald) – 4:40

References

2005 albums
The Lucksmiths albums